Gol Zamin (also Romanized as Gol Zamīn; also known as Gāv Zamīn) is a village in Kharaqan-e Sharqi Rural District, Abgarm District, Avaj County, Qazvin Province, Iran. At the 2006 census, its population was 272, in 59 families.

References 

Populated places in Avaj County